Yevgeni Aleksandrovich Chernov (born 23 October 1992) is a Russian  football player. He plays as a left-back for FC Rostov on loan from FC Krasnodar.

Club career
He made his Russian Premier League debut for FC Tom Tomsk on 27 April 2012 in a game against FC Amkar Perm.

He made his debut for FC Zenit St. Petersburg on 22 September 2016 in a Russian Cup game against FC Tambov.

He played as FC Tosno won the 2017–18 Russian Cup final against FC Avangard Kursk on 9 May 2018 in the Volgograd Arena.

On 10 February 2019, he signed a 3.5-year contract with FC Rostov.

On 6 October 2020, he moved to FC Krasnodar and signed a four-year contract. On 10 July 2022, Chernov returned to FC Rostov on a season-long loan.

International career
He was called up to the senior Russia squad for a friendly against Iran in October 2017. After a break, he was called up again for UEFA Euro 2020 qualifying matches against San Marino and Cyprus in June 2019.

Honours

Club
Tosno
 Russian Cup: 2017–18

Career statistics

References

External links
 

1992 births
Sportspeople from Tomsk
Living people
Russian footballers
Russia youth international footballers
Association football midfielders
Russian Premier League players
Russian First League players
Russian Second League players
FC Tom Tomsk players
FC Yenisey Krasnoyarsk players
FC Zenit Saint Petersburg players
FC Tosno players
FC Rostov players
FC Orenburg players
FC Khimik Dzerzhinsk players
FC Krasnodar players
FC Zenit-2 Saint Petersburg players